Shari Goldhagen is an American author of fiction.

Biography
Goldhagen has been a journalist for National Enquirer, Life & Style, and Celebrity Living Weekly. She has received fellowships from Yaddo, MacDowell, and Ohiana Library Association.

Goldhagen published her first novel  Family And Other Accidents in 2006 to mostly positive reviews. Her second novel, In Some Other World, Maybe was published by St. Martin's Press in January 2015. It was selected as an Elle Lettres 2015 Readers' Prize and received a starred Library Journal review. Her third novel, "100 Days of Cake" published in 2016 by Atheneum was her first foray into young adult fiction.

References

External links
Shari Goldhagen home page
Interview with Shari Goldhagen

Year of birth missing (living people)
Living people
21st-century American novelists
21st-century American women writers
American women novelists